The Song of the Old Days is an Armenian 1982 drama film directed and written by Albert Mkrtchyan.

Plot 
The film takes place during World War II in the city of Leninakan (now Gyumri). The heroes of the film are members of an amateur theater troupe who shared the sorrows and losses of wartime with the whole country.

Cast
 Shahum Ghazaryan - Mushegh
 Frunzik Mkrtchyan - Nikol
 Verjaluys Mirijanyan - Mother Hayastan
 Guzh Manukyan - Ruben
 Azat Gasparyan - Mesrop
 Narine Baghdasaryan - Susan
 Ashot Adamyan - Oberon
 Galya Novents - Oberon's mother

External links
 

1982 films
1982 drama films